Eagle's Fortress was a steel suspended roller coaster at Everland, South Korea. It was opened in 1992 and closed in 2009. Built by American manufacturer Arrow Dynamics, it was one of the last rides of its kind built by the company before going bankrupt in 2002 and was the longest suspended coaster built by Arrow Dynamics with 3,200 ft long track. It was removed in 2014.

References

Everland Resort
Roller coasters in South Korea